Boggo Road busway station is located in Brisbane, Australia serving the suburb of Dutton Park. It opened on 3 August 2009, as part of the Eastern Busway from UQ Lakes to Buranda.

The busway platforms at Boggo Road are numbered 5 and 6 to align with the platforms at the adjacent Park Road railway station.

Transport links 
Brisbane Transport operate seven routes via Boggo Road busway station:
 29: UQ Lakes to Woolloongabba
 66: UQ Lakes to RBWH station via Brisbane City
 104: Corinda station to PA Hospital
 105: Indooroopilly to Brisbane City via Yeronga
 139: UQ Lakes to Sunnybank Hills
 169: UQ Lakes to Eight Mile Plains station
 209: UQ Lakes to Westfield Carindale

Future
Boggo Road railway station, part of the Cross River Rail project, is due to open in 2024 and will provide interchange with the existing busway station.

References

External links
[ Boggo Road station] TransLink

Bus stations in Brisbane
Dutton Park, Queensland
Transport infrastructure completed in 2009